Terence Masters (born 28 March 1945) is a New Zealand cricketer. He played in three first-class matches for Northern Districts in 1969/70.

See also
 List of Northern Districts representative cricketers

References

External links
 

1945 births
Living people
New Zealand cricketers
Northern Districts cricketers
Cricketers from Whanganui